Mu Kappa Tau is a scholastic honor society that recognizes academic achievement among students in the field of marketing.

The society was founded at Arizona State University in 1966 by the members of Pi Sigma Epsilon, and admitted to the Association of College Honor Societies in 1996.

Mu Kappa Tau honor society has 405 active chapters across the United States, and a total membership of approximately 15,000.

See also
 Association of College Honor Societies

References

External links
 
 Mu Kappa Tau at Association of College Honor Societies

Association of College Honor Societies
Honor societies